George Alcorn may refer to:

 George Edward Alcorn Jr. (born 1940), American physicist, engineer, inventor, and professor
 George Oscar Alcorn (1850–1930), Canadian lawyer and politician